The Independent Party of Alkmaar (OPA) is a municipal political party from Alkmaar. It won seven seats in the 2010 municipal election., ten in the 2014 municipal election and six in the 2018 municipal election

References

Alkmaar
Local political parties in the Netherlands